Danville, also known as Houstons Store, is an unincorporated community in Morgan County, Alabama, United States, and is included in the Decatur metropolitan area and the larger Huntsville-Decatur combined statistical area.

Demographics

Danville appeared on the 1880 U.S. Census with a population of 117. This was the only time it appeared on census rolls.

Notable people
Dave Albritton, a track and field athlete, won a silver medal in the 1936 Summer Olympics. Albritton was the first African American to hold the world high jump record, at 6'9 3/4".
Nathaniel Barrett, physician and politician

References

Unincorporated communities in Alabama
Unincorporated communities in Morgan County, Alabama
Decatur metropolitan area, Alabama
Huntsville-Decatur, AL Combined Statistical Area